The 2011–12 C.D. Motagua season in the Honduran Liga Nacional was F.C. Motagua's 61st season in its history; the domestic league was divided into two tournaments, Apertura and Clausura. The Apertura started on 7 August, but due to its participation in the 2011–12 CONCACAF Champions League, their first official game was played on 28 July 2011. Motagua, as title holders, were looking for its 13th domestic championship, and its first CONCACAF achievement. The pre-season started on 20 June 2011.

Overview
The club announced its first signing on 29 April 2011, Honduran striker Luis López arrived for a one-year contract. Also, 37-year-old goalkeeper Kerpo de León joined after a prominent performance at C.D.S. Vida. On 3 June, Honduran midfielder Carlos Discua was transferred from Guatemalan side C.S.D. Comunicaciones. In the evening of 15 June 2011, midfielder Jorge Claros was shot twice in the head and clavicle by two unidentified persons who tried to steal his car in a neighbor in San Pedro Sula, Claros escaped injured but in a stable condition. On 22 August, the club signed 22-year-old Colombian striker John Palacios from ASA.

Motagua's first game in the league was on 7 August at Estadio Fausto Flores Lagos against C.D. Necaxa losing 0–1. On 16 September, due to poor performance both in the league and the Champions League, the club's president Pedro Atala took the decision to separate Ramón Maradiaga as manager; leaving Luis Reyes as a temporary replacement. Three days later, on 19 September, Mexican coach José Treviño arrived as new manager for the rest of the season; while Colombian striker John Palacios left the team just one month after his signing arguing differences with teammates.

On 22 September, the club released a pink jersey to be worn on all the games from October, in a way to support the fight against breast cancer. On 3 October, striker Jerry Bengtson appeared 50th on The World's Top Goal Scorer 2011 list published by the IFFHS. On 11 October, the Disciplinary Commission forced Motagua to play its home game against C.D. Marathón in a neutral venue due to the incidents occurred on 9 October at the Estadio Tiburcio Carías Andino in the Honduran Superclásico against C.D. Olimpia where one unidentified Motagua fan throw an object to the field injuring rival's player Carlos Mejía at the end of the match; however, Motagua appeal to the decision and the penalization was revoked on 13 October.

On 19 November, Motagua was eliminated from the postseason despite winning the last four games in a row; this disqualification was the 13th in Motagua's history.

The Clausura tournament was scheduled to be played from January to May 2012. Manager José Treviño declared interest in signing Brazilian striker José Dias but later desisted; the club announced on 5 December 2011 to have signed Honduran strikers Georgie Welcome and Melvin Valladares who came from Mexican clubs Club Atlas and Dorados de Sinaloa respectively. One day later Arnold Peralta also joined from C.D.S. Vida but due to wages disagreements, the midfielder refused to sign. The Clausura fixtures were announced on 8 December, and Motagua faced C.D. Necaxa away on round 1.

In December 2011, the IFFHS published a list of "The World's Top Goal Scorer 2011", and Motagua's striker Jerry Bengtson appeared in the list ranked 24th.

Motagua initiated the Clausura tournament with a 2–2 away draw against Necaxa at Estadio Fausto Flores Lagos. In round 12, Motagua defeated Real C.D. España 2–0 at Tegucigalpa, breaking their own 1974 record for the longest unbeaten start in a season, streak that lasted until 5 May totaling 19 games undefeated. The qualification to the second round was acquired on 14 April at Estadio Yankel Rosenthal in the 0–1 away victory over C.D. Marathón. Motagua won two more games after that and became the second team in the history of the league that finished the regular season without defeats; C.D. Olimpia had already done it twice in 1969–70 and 1997–98 Clausura.

As second placed at the end of the regular season, Motagua obtained an automatic ticket to the semifinals; the opponent was decided from the previous round, where Marathón beat Vida. Once in the semifinals, Motagua were unable to surpass Marathón and lost 0–2 on aggregate score, this being the second consecutive time that they were prematurely eliminated. With only one defeat in the season, Motagua matched the records obtained in 1973–74 and 1999–2000 A. Also, due to great performance from both goalkeepers Donaldo Morales and Kerpo de León, Motagua broke its own record of fewest goals conceded in a season, with only 12; the previous record was 15 conceded goals in 1973–74.

In the Reserves tournament, the youth team captured the 2011–12 Clausura season.

Players

Transfers in

Transfers out

Squad
 Statistics as of 5 May 2012
 Only league matches into account

Results

Preseason and friendlies

Apertura

Clausura

CONCACAF Champions League

As 2010–11 Clausura league champions, F.C. Motagua qualified to the Preliminary Round of the 2011–12 CONCACAF Champions League. On 24 June 2011, CONCACAF announced the first stage schedule which paired Motagua against C.S.D. Municipal. On 4 August 2011, Motagua advanced to the Group phase after a 4–2 score on aggregate over Municipal. Once in the Group phase, things went upside down for Motagua and on 22 September, they were mathematically eliminated from quarterfinal contention after losing 0–2 against Monarcas Morelia at Estadio Tiburcio Carías Andino. At the end of the group phase, Motagua not only were eliminated, but finished last with zero points with a sixth straight loss.

References

External links
Motagua Official Website

F.C. Motagua seasons
Motagua
Motagua